The Auchumpkee Creek Covered Bridge, near Thomaston, Georgia, was built in 1898.  It was listed on the National Register of Historic Places in 1975.

It is a Town lattice truss bridge.  It has also been called the Hootenville Covered Bridge.

"It spans Auchumpkee Creek in the Hootenville Militia District of Upson County, Georgia. The bridge is completely covered and extends 120 feet 9 inches in length resting on two native stone piers held together with cement."

See also
List of covered bridges in Georgia

References

Covered bridges in Georgia (U.S. state)
National Register of Historic Places in Upson County, Georgia
Transport infrastructure completed in 1898